Mauritania made its Paralympic Games début at the 2000 Summer Paralympics in Sydney. It was represented by a female sprinter (Ezouha Mint Mohamed) and a male powerlifter (Mohamed Ould Bahaida). The country competed again in 2004, with runner Ezzouha Edidal as its sole representative.

Mauritania did not take part in the 2008 Summer Paralympics, and has never participated in the Winter Paralympics. No Mauritanian has ever won a Paralympic medal.

Medal tables

See also
 Mauritania at the Olympics

References